The 1998 Argentina rugby union tour of Japan and Europe   were two a series of matches played by the Argentina national rugby union team . 
The first tour (two match) was held in September, the second in November.

Matches

in Japan 
Scores and results list Argentina's points tally first.

In Europe 
Scores and results list Argentina's points tally first.

References

Sources

1998
1998
1998
1998
1998
1998–99 in European rugby union
1998 in Argentine rugby union
1998–99 in Italian rugby union
1998–99 in Welsh rugby union
1998–99 in French rugby union
History of rugby union matches between Argentina and Wales